Prelude to a Kiss is a 1988 play by Craig Lucas. The play, with a runtime of roughly 70 minutes, tells the story of Peter and Rita, a couple that falls in love despite the woman's pessimistic fear of the world. Shortly after their wedding, a supernatural event tests the strength of their love and commitment to each other. When it premiered, it was considered by many critics to be an allegory for couples affected by the AIDS crisis.

A preview version of the play premiered on January 15, 1988, in Costa Mesa, California, directed by Norman René. Following this, the play was revised and made its official debut on March 14, 1990, in New York City. The revised, official version was directed by Réné, with Alec Baldwin and Mary-Louise Parker as Peter and Rita. The title is taken from the 1938 torch song of the same title by Duke Ellington.

The play was later adapted into a 1992 film of the same title. Lucas adapted the play into a screenplay himself, and the play's original director Norman René. Alec Baldwin returned to play the role of Peter for the film, while Rita was played by Meg Ryan.

Plot synopsis
Peter is a self-conscious employee at a publishing firm who attends a party. There he meets Rita, a seemingly carefree part-time bartender who hopes to be a graphic designer. The two realize a mutual attraction and begin dating. Over time, Rita reveals her fears about the world, and her hesitancy to invest in joy or dreams when she expects bad things are more likely to happen than good. Despite this, she falls in love with Peter and agrees to marry him.

Some time later, the two marry. At their wedding reception, they encounter an unknown Old Man who was passing by and wanted to wish the couple good luck. The Old Man asks to kiss the bride before he leaves and Rita agrees, charmed. As they kiss, Rita and the Old Man magically exchange bodies. Confused and disoriented, Rita wanders away, now inhabiting an elderly male form, while "Rita" and Peter embark on a honeymoon in Jamaica. During the trip, Peter is confused by his wife's new personality and inability to remember basic details of her own life. When they return home, "Rita" seems back to her old self and kisses Peter. After the kiss, Peter realizes this isn't his wife and concludes the impostor read Rita's diary to better masquerade as her. Panicked, he demands her return then leaves the apartment.

At the bar where Rita worked, Peter sees the Old Man from the wedding reception. They talk and Peter realizes this is the real Rita, who has been living as the Old Man (whose name is Julius). They hope to make another body swap, but discover the Old Man has fled to stay with Rita's parents the Boyles, telling them the marriage is in turmoil and separation is needed. Peter meets Leah, Julius's daughter, and learns the Old Man is a retired widower who has terminal cancer, with maybe a year left to live. As they consider what to do, Peter and Rita live together as a couple again. Rita now appreciates life more deeply, while Peter realizes he loves her despite the shell she inhabits changing how they relate physically.

Peter and Rita finally confront Julius, but the Old Man himself isn't sure how to cause the body swap. He came upon their wedding by chance and envied the bride's youth due to his fear of dying. Rita realizes that during their kiss, she had felt envy for the Old Man as well, wishing she could be someone who had already survived into old age despite any obstacles. As the two realize they no longer have the fears they felt that day, Rita and Julius exchange souls again. Julius takes his leave as Rita and Peter reunite.

Original cast
Costa Mesa Performance:

 Mark Arnott as Peter
 Lisa Zane as Rita
 Frank Hamilton as Old Man
 Hal Landon, Jr. as Dr. Boyle
 Teri Ralston as Mrs. Boyle
 Michael Canavan as Taylor
 John-David Keller as Minister
 Art Koustik as Tom
 Roberta Farkas as Aunt Dorothy
 Mary Anne McGarry as Leah

Revised Play, New York Premiere:

 Alec Baldwin as Peter
 Mary-Louise Parker as Rita
 Barnard Hughes as Old Man
 Larry Bryggman as Dr. Boyle
 Debra Monk as Mrs. Boyle
 John Dossett as Taylor
 Craig Brockhorn as Minister
 L. Peter Callender as Tom/Jamaican Waiter
 Joyce Reehling as Aunt Dorothy/Leah
 Michael Warren Powell as Uncle Fred
 Kimberly Dudwitt, Pete Tyler as Ensemble

Dramatic analysis
Critic Frank Rich wrote: "...this play can be taken as an indirect treatment of [AIDS]. The epidemic is to Mr. Lucas what Babi Yar was to D. M. Thomas, and Peter's fidelity to his true love's soul is transparent. Critic James Hebert wrote: "When it premiered in 1990 it was widely presumed to be an oblique response to the ravages of AIDS. Long removed from that time, it becomes a broader commentary on eternal topics like the limits of love and the meaning of commitment."

Productions
The play was commissioned and originally staged by South Coast Repertory, Costa Mesa, California in January 1988. After revisions to the script and direction, the official version opened off-Broadway at Circle Repertory Company on March 14, 1990 (February 20 previews) starring Alec Baldwin, Mary-Louise Parker, Debra Monk, L. Peter Callender, Craig Bockhorn, Michael Warren Powell and John Dossett, and directed by Norman René, who had directed at South Coast Repertory.

After receiving rave reviews, the production moved to the Helen Hayes Theatre on Broadway, on May 1, 1990, with Timothy Hutton replacing Baldwin. Other cast members included Barnard Hughes, Debra Monk, John Dossett, and Larry Bryggman. The play closed on May 19, 1991, after 440 performances, received a Tony Award nomination as Best Play, and was a finalist for the Pulitzer Prize for Drama.

A revival was produced in 2003 at the Pacific Resident Theatre in Venice, California.

A revival opened on Broadway at the American Airlines Theatre on March 8, 2007, produced by the Roundabout Theatre Company. Alan Tudyk, Annie Parisse and John Mahoney starred in the lead roles, with Robin Bartlett, James Rebhorn, and Matthew Rauch in the featured supporting cast. The show was directed by Daniel Sullivan with original music by John Gromada, scenery by Santo Loquasto, costumes by Jane Greenwood, and lighting by Donald Holder.

A film version came out in 1992 starring Alec Baldwin and Meg Ryan.

References

External links

1988 plays
Plays by Craig Lucas
Fiction about body swapping
Broadway plays
American plays adapted into films
Magic realism plays